Free games can mean:

Free games which are free software and make use of free content
Open source games that are open source software
Freeware games which are gratis but not free software
Shareware games that are freely downloadable trial versions of for-pay games